Benno Gut  (1 April 1897 – 8 December 1970) was a Benedictine monk of the Archabbey of Maria Einsiedeln, Switzerland, and a cardinal of the Roman Catholic Church. He served as prefect of the Congregation for Divine Worship in the Roman Curia from 1969 until his death, and was elevated to the cardinalate in 1967.

Biography
Walter Gut was born in Reiden, Switzerland, entered the Order of Saint Benedict at the Archabbey of Maria Einsiedeln, made his monastic profession as a monk on 6 January 1918, and was given the name of "Benno". He began his studies at the College of Maria Einsideln, at the musical conservatory of Basel, University of Basel, at the Benedictine Pontificio Sant'Anselmo in Rome, and at the Pontifical Biblical Institute in Rome. Ordained to the priesthood on 10 July 1921, Gut finished his studies in 1923 and then did pastoral work at Einsiedeln Abbey until 1930.

Gut taught at his alma mater of "Pontificio Sant'Anselmo" from 1930 to 1939, at which time he returned to Switzerland and became a professor at the Einsiedeln Abbey College. On 15 April 1947 he was elected abbot of the Archabbey of Maria Einsiedeln, receiving the traditional episcopal benediction of new abbots from Archbishop Filippo Bernardini on the following 5 May. On 24 September 1959, Gut was elected as the fourth Abbot Primate of the Benedictine Confederation. From 1962 to 1965 he attended the Second Vatican Council.

On 10 June 1967 Gut was appointed Titular Archbishop of Thuccabora by Pope Paul VI. He received his episcopal consecration eight days later, on 18 June, from Cardinal Eugène Cardinal Tisserant, with Bishops Joseph Hasler and Johannes Vonderach serving as co-consecrators, at the Archabbey of Maria Einsiedeln.

Pope Paul VI created him Cardinal Deacon of San Giorgio al Velabro in the consistory of 26 June the same year in advance of naming him prefect of Congregation of Rites on the following 29 June. Along with prefect of rites, Gut also assumed in 1968 the position of president of the consilium for liturgical reform, of which the Benedictine abbot was an advocate. He later resigned as abbot primate of the Benedictine Confederation on 8 September 1967. With the dissolution of the Congregation of Rites, the cardinal became prefect of the newly established Congregation for Divine Worship on 7 May 1969.

Gut died in Rome at the age of 73. He is buried in Archabbey of Maria Einsiedeln.

References

External links
 Archabbey of Maria Einsiedeln (in German)
 Pontificio Ateneo Sant'Anselmo (in Italian and English)
 The Benedictine Confederation of Congregations of Monasteries of the Order of Saint Benedict (in Italian and English)
 International Atlas of Benedictine Monasteries (in English)
 Catholic-Hierarchy

1897 births
1970 deaths
Swiss abbots
Swiss cardinals
Swiss Roman Catholics
Swiss Benedictines
Participants in the Second Vatican Council
Members of the Sacred Congregation for Rites
Cardinals created by Pope Paul VI
Abbots Primate
Pontifical Biblical Institute alumni
Benedictine abbots
Benedictine cardinals